Shawn Patrick Hillegas (born August 21, 1964) is a former professional right-handed pitcher. He played for the Los Angeles Dodgers, Chicago White Sox, Cleveland Indians, New York Yankees and Oakland Athletics of Major League Baseball (MLB).

Biography
Hillegas was born in Dos Palos, California, on August 21, 1964.

Hillegas was 6'3", 190 pounds (although one source says he was 6'2", 208 pounds) and he threw and batted right-handed. He attended Forest Hills High School in Sidman, Pennsylvania, and then Middle Georgia College.

Career
Hillegas was drafted by the California Angels in the 26th round (657th overall) of the 1983 draft. He opted not to sign that year. In 1984, he signed with the Los Angeles Dodgers after being drafted 4th overall in the first round.

He did well in the minors for the most part, having only one real bad stretch: in 1986 with the Albuquerque Dukes, he had a 6.17 ERA in 9 games. His best minor league season statistically was 1984 with the Vero Beach Dodgers, where he had a 1.83 ERA in 13 games.

On August 9, 1987, Hillegas made his major league debut. He lived up to his first round status in his debut-he pitched 8 innings with 6 strikeouts and 2 earned runs for the win. Perhaps his best Major League season was his rookie year-he went 4-3 with a 3.57 ERA in 58 innings pitched.

Overall in his career, he went 24-38, with a 4.61 ERA. He never quite lived up to his 1st round status as a whole. As a batter, he went 2-29-that's a .069 batting average. He committed 9 errors in the field, for a .900 fielding percentage.  He balked only once in his career.

He played his final game on July 17, 1993.

Major transactions
On August 30, 1988, Hillegas was traded to the White Sox from the Dodgers for Ricky Horton.
On December 4, 1990, Hillegas was traded with Eric King from the White Sox to the Indians for Cory Snyder and minor leaguer Lindsay Foster.

References

External links

1964 births
Living people
Albuquerque Dukes players
Alexandria Aces players
American expatriate baseball players in Canada
American expatriate baseball players in Mexico
Baseball players from California
Chicago White Sox players
Cleveland Indians players
Columbus Clippers players
Fort Lauderdale Yankees players
Los Angeles Dodgers players
Major League Baseball pitchers
Middle Georgia Warriors baseball players
Mexican League baseball pitchers
New York Yankees players
Oakland Athletics players
San Antonio Dodgers players
Saraperos de Saltillo players
Tacoma Tigers players
Vancouver Canadians players
Vero Beach Dodgers players